The Renaissance Pleasure Faire of Southern California (RPFS) is a Renaissance faire that takes place in Irwindale, California. It opened in the spring of 1963 and has been an annual event since then.  Presently owned by Renaissance Entertainment Productions (REP), it is a commercial reenactment of a 1580s market faire at Port Deptford, a waterfront town in Elizabethan era England. The Faire is generally open from the first weekend of April through the weekend before Memorial Day.

History
Created by Ron Patterson and Phyllis Patterson and the radio station KPFK, the first Renaissance Pleasure Faire of Southern California (RPFS) was first staged at Agoura Hills in the spring of 1963.  The first Renaissance Pleasure Faire of Northern California (RPFN) occurred in the fall of 1967. The nonprofit organization Living History Centre (LHC) was established in 1968 as a way to establish the location of the Renaissance Pleasure Faire and as a way to reify the educational potentials of the public event.  
 
In 1989, RPFS was moved to the Glen Helen Regional Park in Devore, California; and finally in 2005 to its present location, the Santa Fe Dam Recreation Area in Irwindale, California.

In 1999, RPFN was moved to the Nut Tree in Vacaville, California and later was relocated again to Casa de Fruta in the Hollister/Gilroy area south of San Jose.

In 1993, RPFS was purchased by Renaissance Entertainment Corp (REC), a for-profit corporation; and later by its current owners, Renaissance Entertainment Productions (REP) (also a for-profit corporation), under whom the Faire has claimed to be more family-oriented.

In 2005, the RPFS relocated from Devore, California to Irwindale, California.

The COVID-19 pandemic caused the faire to go on hiatus from 2020 to 2021. It resumed in April 2022.

Attire
The costumes worn by official RPFS's actors are styled after those of the period of Elizabeth I of England (15581603) and must pass a rigorous approval process ensuring their authenticity. There are five general classes of attire: Yeoman, Merchant, Gentry, Nobility and Military. Other cultures represented include Scottish/Irish Highlanders, Germanic Landsknechts, Italians, Spaniards, and various Arabian cultures. There are also performance groups such as mongers, Puritans, adventurers and inventors, which are organized into guilds. Patrons are encouraged to wear Renaissance-inspired costumes, but are not required to adhere to the Elizabethan period. They are also welcomed to participate by dressing up to join the fun on various themed weekends. (i.e. RenCon, Pirates, Heroes & Villains, etc...) Recent themed weekends include categories such as "time traveler weekend" which suggest patrons attend in costume from any time period and any location in the world. While this broadens the scope of potential patron interest, it may detract from the Elizabethan tone of the setting.

See also 

 Renaissance fair
 List of Renaissance and Medieval fairs
 Reenactment
 Jousting
 Society for Creative Anachronism
 List of open-air and living history museums in the United States

Further reading

References

External links

Fairs in California
Festivals in California
Renaissance fairs
Annual events in Los Angeles County, California
Annual fairs
Irwindale, California